Rough House is a studio album by jazz guitarist John Scofield. It features pianist Hal Galper, bassist Stafford James and drummer Adam Nussbaum (who would go on to play in Scofield’s trio).

Track listing

Personnel
John Scofield – guitar
Hal Galper – piano
Stafford James – bass
Adam Nussbaum – drums

References 

1978 albums
Enja Records albums
John Scofield albums